Thomas Littleton may refer to:

 Sir Thomas Littleton, 3rd Baronet (1647–1709), British statesman
 Sir Thomas Littleton, 2nd Baronet (c. 1621–1681), English MP
 Thomas de Littleton (c. 1407–1481), English judge and legal writer

See also
 Thomas Lyttelton (disambiguation)